James Van Fossen (born May 5, 1960) is a former Iowa State Representative from the 81st and 42nd Districts. A Republican, he served in the Iowa House of Representatives from 1995 to 2009.  He received his BBA from Saint Ambrose University.

During his last term in the Iowa House, Van Fossen served on the Commerce, Economic Growth, Local Government, and Ways and Means committees.

Van Fossen was first elected in 1994 in then-District 42.  After the districts were redrawn for the 2002 election, he served in the 81st district.  He left office in 2009, having lost his 2008 reelection bid to Democratic opponent Phyllis Thede.

Electoral history
*incumbent

References

External links

 
 Van Fossen on Project Vote Smart
 Van Fossen's Capitol Web Address

Republican Party members of the Iowa House of Representatives
Living people
1960 births
St. Ambrose University alumni
Politicians from Rock Island, Illinois
Politicians from Davenport, Iowa